The Chapel of Saint Helena in Považská Bystrica, Slovakia, was built in 1728 in the Baroque style by Count Peter Szapáry. After it was built, it was  robbed and badly damaged more than once, which led to a massive restoration effort in the 1990s. Today the chapel is located on a housing estate and is currently holding regular church services.

Footnotes

External links 
 Photos and 3D model of Chapel of Saint Helena

Churches completed in 1728
Churches in Trenčín Region
18th-century churches in Slovakia
1728 establishments in the Habsburg monarchy
18th-century establishments in Hungary